Raffles City Hangzhou is a large-scale commercial center including office buildings, star-rated hotels, serviced apartments and shopping centers located in the core area of Qianjiang New City in Hangzhou, Zhejiang, China. It is CapitaLand's sixth Raffles City after Singapore, Shanghai, Beijing, Chengdu and Bahrain. In 2019, Raffles City Hangzhou won the 2019 FIABCI World Prix d'Excellence Awards Retail World Gold Award.

See also
Raffles City
List of tallest buildings in Hangzhou

References

External links

unstudio's Raffles City Hangzhou homepage
Developer's Raffles City Chongqing homepage

Buildings and structures under construction in China
CapitaLand
Skyscrapers in Hangzhou